Boris Becker and John Fitzgerald were the defending champions but they competed with different partners that year, Becker with Robert Seguso and Fitzgerald with Eric Jelen.

Fitzgerald and Jelen lost in the first round to Matt Anger and Kelly Evernden.

Becker and Seguso lost in the final 6–3, 6–2 to Darren Cahill and Mark Kratzmann.

Seeds

  Boris Becker /  Robert Seguso (final)
  Paul Annacone /  Slobodan Živojinović (quarterfinals)
  Scott Davis /  Mike De Palmer (quarterfinals)
  Peter Doohan /  Sammy Giammalva Jr. (quarterfinals)

Draw

External links
1987 Swan Premium Open Doubles Draw

Doubles